Sarwan may refer to:

Places

Azerbaijan 
Sarvan, Davachi
Sarvan, Salyan

Georgia 
Marneuli, formerly Sarvan

India 
Sarvan, Madhya Pradesh

Iran 
Servan

Tajikistan 
Sarvan, Tajikistan

Art and entertainment 
Sarvan (comics), a Spanish comics series